San Francisco Libre is a municipality in the Managua department of Nicaragua.

International relations

Twin towns – Sister cities
San Francisco Libre is twinned with Reading (UK).

References

Municipalities of the Managua Department